John Cullen is an ice hockey player.

John Cullen may also refer to:

John Cullen (baseball) (1854–1921), Major League Baseball player
John Cullen (chemical engineer) (1926–2018), head of the UK Health and Safety Commission
John Cullen (field hockey) (born 1937), New Zealand competitor in field hockey at the 1964 Summer Olympics
John Cullen (police officer) (1850–1939), New Zealand police officer and commissioner
John Cullen (rugby union) (born 1990), American rugby union player
John Hugh Cullen (1883–1970), Irish-born Catholic priest, writer and historian in Australia
John J. Cullen (1845–1896), New York politician
John Michael Cullen (1927–2001), ornithologist
Sir John Cullen, 2nd Baronet (1652–1677), of the Cullen baronets

See also
Jon Cullen (born 1973), footballer
Jack Cullen (born 1939), baseball player
Cullen (surname)